Post High School is a public high school in Post, Texas, United States. It is part of the Post Independent School District and classified as a 2A school by the University Interscholastic League. In 2015, the school was rated "Met Standard" by the Texas Education Agency.

Athletics 
The Post Antelopes compete in these sports - 

Baseball
Basketball
Cross Country
Football
Golf
Powerlifting
Softball
Tennis
Track and Field
Volleyball

State Titles 
Girls Golf - 
1996 (2A)

References

External links 
 

Public high schools in Texas